(born ; 4 June 1923), is a member of the Imperial House of Japan as the widow of Takahito, Prince Mikasa, the fourth son of Emperor Taishō and Empress Teimei. The Princess is the last surviving paternal great-aunt by marriage of Emperor Naruhito, and currently is the oldest member of the imperial family, and the only living member who was born in the Taishō period.

Early life
Princess Mikasa was born on 4 June 1923 at Takagi's family house in Tokyo. She is the second daughter of Viscount Masanari Takagi (1894–1948) and Kuniko Irie (1901–1988). Her father was a member of the Takagi clan, formerly lords of the small feudal domain of Tan'an; through her father, she is a great-great-granddaughter of Hotta Masayoshi, a prominent rōjū, or shōgunal minister, during the Bakumatsu period. Her mother was descended from the noble Yanagihara clan, and was a second cousin of Emperor Shōwa; the Emperor's grandmother, Lady Yanagiwara Naruko, was Kuniko's great-aunt. Yuriko graduated from Gakushuin Women's Academy in 1941.

Marriage
On 29 March 1941, Yuriko's engagement to her second cousin once removed, Takahito, Prince Mikasa, was announced. The engagement ceremony was held on 3 October 1941, and the wedding ceremony took place on 22 October 1941. After her marriage, Yuriko was styled Her Imperial Highness The Princess Mikasa. Princess Mikasa frequently visited her husband who was hospitalized during his final months. On 22 October 2016, they celebrated their 75th wedding anniversary in his hospital room. Prince Mikasa died five days later, with Princess Yuriko at his side. The Princess led her husband's funeral ceremony as the chief mourner.

The Prince and Princess had five children, of whom only two are still living. The couple's two daughters left the imperial family upon marriage. All three sons predeceased them. In addition to their five children, they had nine grandchildren and seven great-grandchildren as of 2022.

Children

  (formerly ; married on 16 December 1966 to Tadateru Konoe, younger brother of former Prime Minister Morihiro Hosokawa and adopted grandson (and heir) of former Prime Minister Fumimaro Konoe, currently President of the Japanese Red Cross Society; has a son, Tadahiro, who has three children.
 ; heir apparent; married on 7 November 1980 to Nobuko Asō (born 9 April 1955), third daughter of Takakichi Asō, chairman of Aso Cement Co., and his wife, Kazuko, the daughter of former Prime Minister Shigeru Yoshida; had two daughters.
 ; created Katsura-no-miya on 1 January 1988.
  (formerly ; married on 14 October 1983 to Sōshitsu Sen (born 7 June 1956), the elder son of Sōshitsu Sen XV, and currently the sixteenth hereditary grand master (iemoto) of the Urasenke Japanese tea ceremony School; and has two sons, Akifumi and Takafumi, and a daughter, Makiko.
 ; created Takamado-no-miya on 1 December 1984; married on 6 December 1984 to Hisako Tottori (born 10 July 1953), eldest daughter of Shigejiro Tottori, former President, Mitsui & Co. in France; and had three daughters.

Public service

Princess Mikasa is honorary president of various charitable organizations, especially those concerned with the preservation of traditional Japanese culture.  She also plays an active role in the Japanese Red Cross Society.

In 1948, the Princess became President of the Imperial Gift Foundation Boshi-Aiiku-kai, a position that she resigned from in September 2010. She has attended several formal occasions in Tokyo as well as other parts of Japan associated with charities concerned with mother and child health issues.

Health
The princess has used a pacemaker since 1999. In September 2020, the 97-year-old was hospitalized with symptoms of heart failure and pneumonia, but was subsequently released after two weeks. She was notably absent from the 2019 enthronement of Emperor Naruhito. She was admitted to St. Luke's International Hospital in March 2021 due to arrhythmia. It was also announced that her condition was not critical and she was discharged within a few days as her symptoms subsided. 

In July 2022, she was reported to have tested positive for COVID-19 and hospitalized at St. Luke's International Hospital in Tokyo with a slight fever over 37°C and a slight cough, at the age of 99. Her vaccination status was not publicized for reasons of personal privacy.

Honours

National
 Grand Cordon of the Order of the Precious Crown
 Dame of the Decoration of the Red Cross
 Recipient of the Red Cross Medal

Foreign
  Empire of Iran: Member 2nd Class of the Order of the Pleiades
  Empire of Iran: Commemorative Medal of the 2500th Anniversary of the founding of the Persian Empire (14 October 1971)

Honorary positions
 Reserve Member of the Imperial House Council
 Honorary Vice-President of the Japanese Red Cross Society

Issue

References

External links

Her Imperial Highness Princess Mikasa and her family at the Imperial Household Agency website
Japan Red Cross Society | At a glance

Japanese princesses
1923 births
Living people
People from Tokyo

Grand Cordons (Imperial Family) of the Order of the Precious Crown

20th-century Japanese women
21st-century Japanese women
Princesses by marriage